The 5th Fénix Awards was presented at Mexico City's Teatro de la Ciudad, on November 7, 2018 to honour the best in Ibero-American films of 2017-2018.

Zama and Birds of Passage received the most nominations with nine, with the first receiving the most, four.

Winners and nominees

Special Awards
 Fénix Award for Cinematographic Work: Luiz Carlos Barreto
 Fénix Award for Critical Work: Luciano Monteagudo
 Fénix Award for the Exhibitors: Perfect Strangers

References

External links
 Official site

5
Fenix Awards